Man of the Forest is a 1921 American silent Western film directed by Howard Hickman and starring Carl Gantvoort, Claire Adams and Robert McKim.

Plot

Cast
 Carl Gantvoort as Milt Dale
 Claire Adams as Helen Raynor
 Robert McKimas Harvey Riggs
 Jean Hersholt as Lem Beasley
 Harry Lorraine as Al Auchincloss
 Eugenia Gilbert as Bessie Beasley
 Frank Hayes as Los Vegas
 Charlotte Pierce as Bo Raynor
 Charles Murphy as Snake Anson
 Fred Starr as Jim Wilson 
 Tote Du Crow as Lone Wolf

References

Bibliography
 Munden, Kenneth White. The American Film Institute Catalog of Motion Pictures Produced in the United States, Part 1. University of California Press, 1997.

External links
 

1921 films
1921 Western (genre) films
Films based on works by Zane Grey
Films directed by Howard Hickman
Films distributed by W. W. Hodkinson Corporation
Silent American Western (genre) films
1920s English-language films
1920s American films
Films with screenplays by Richard Schayer